Mohammad Shahbaz Bashir (born 27 December 1983) is a Pakistani-born Dutch former cricketer.

Bashir was born at Lahore in December 1983. He was made his debut in List A one-day cricket for the Pakistan Cricket Board Greens against the Pakistan Cricket Board Blues at Lahore in November 2002. He later emigrated to the Netherlands, qualifying to play for them through residency in 2012. He made a single appearance in first-class cricket for the Netherlands against United Arab Emirates (UAE) in July 2012 at Deventer in the Intercontinental Cup. He became the first Dutch player to a score a century on first-class debut, making 102. Bashir also made three List A appearances for the Netherlands, the first coming against Leicestershire in the 2012 Clydesdale Bank 40, an English domestic one-day tournament the Netherlands were invited to take part in. He then made a further two appearances against the UAE following the Intercontinental Cup match. In four List A appearances, Bashir scored 35 runs with a highest score of 30. He took a wicket apiece in both first-class and List A cricket.

References

External links

1983 births
Living people
Cricketers from Lahore
Pakistani cricketers
Pakistan Cricket Board Greens cricketers
Pakistani emigrants to the Netherlands
Dutch cricketers